HC Olimpus-85-USEFS is a Moldovan handball team located in Chișinău. They compete in the National Super League of Moldova.

Titles 

 National Super League
 Winners (4): 2010, 2011, 2014, 2016
 Runner-Up (8): 2001, 2002, 2003, 2004, 2005, 2006, 2007, 2008

European record

Team

Current squad 

Squad for the 2016–17 season

Goalkeepers
 Andrei Sapojnicov
 Victor Serdiuc 
 Dmytro Veremchuk

Wingers
RW
  Igor Ilcovici-Hodus 
LW 
  Andrei Cojocaru
  Artiom Juravliov
  Alexandru Ous
  Alexandr Selemet
Line players 
  Daniel Furtuna
  Andrei Minciuc
  Denis Sicaciov

Back players
LB
  Dmitri Bobruico
  Alexandr Boret
  Alexei Liubinskii
  Oleksandr Orliohlo
  Alexandru Pervanciuc
  Nichita Savcenco
  Rodion Zvenihorodskyi
CB 
  Serghei Nazarco
  Calin Oprea
  Alexei Pervanciuc 
  Maxim Plesca
RB
  Artem Mogilka
  Maxim Sipulin

External links

Sport in Chișinău
Handball clubs
Handball in Moldova
Sports clubs in Moldova